Phil Berna (born April 7, 1996) is a Canadian rugby sevens player.

Career
Berna won silver as part of Canada's team at the 2019 Pan American Games in Lima. In June 2021, Berna was named to Canada's 2020 Olympic team.

In 2022, He competed for Canada at the 2022 Rugby World Cup Sevens in Cape Town.

References

1996 births
Living people
Canada international rugby sevens players
Rugby sevens players at the 2019 Pan American Games
Pan American Games silver medalists for Canada
Medalists at the 2019 Pan American Games
Pan American Games medalists in rugby sevens
Sportspeople from Vancouver
Rugby sevens players at the 2020 Summer Olympics
Olympic rugby sevens players of Canada
Rugby sevens players at the 2022 Commonwealth Games